Gonzague is a masculine given name. Notable people with the name include:

Gonzague de Reynold (1880–1970), Swiss writer and historian
Gonzague Truc (1877–1972), French writer
Gonzague Vandooren (born 1979), Belgian footballer
Gonzague Saint Bris (1948–2017), French novelist, biographer and journalist

See also
House of Gonzaga

Masculine given names